American recording artist Alison Sudol, as moniker A Fine Frenzy, has released three studio albums, five extended plays (EPs), one live album and fifteen singles. The first single, Almost Lover, peaked at number 25 on Billboard's Hot Adult Contemporary Tracks chart. In mid-2007, she secured another opening spot, this time for Rufus Wainwright on his tour. The debut album, One Cell in the Sea was released on July 17, 2007. Sudol's second album, Bomb in a Birdcage, was released September 8, 2009. The first single, "Blow Away," was released on July 17, 2009, followed by two more singles, "Happier" and "Electric Twist."

On November 23, 2009, a live album and concert film recorded in 2007, A Fine Frenzy Live at the House of Blues Chicago, was released on iTunes. The third album, Pines, was released on October 9, 2012. In June 2015 Sudol stated that she will no longer perform as A Fine Frenzy. "A few years ago I put A Fine Frenzy to bed.” Although choosing acting she continues to write songs.

Albums

Studio albums

Live albums

Extended plays

Singles

Promotional singles

Other appearances

Music videos

Footnotes

References

Discographies of American artists
Alternative rock discographies